Stephen Beatty (born 11 April 1959) is a Canadian rower. He competed in the men's coxless four event at the 1984 Summer Olympics.

References

External links
 

1959 births
Living people
Canadian male rowers
Olympic rowers of Canada
Rowers at the 1984 Summer Olympics
People from Woodstock, Ontario